Duque is a Spanish surname meaning "duke".

People
Notable people with the name include:
 Jaime Enrique Duque Correa (1943–2013), Colombian Roman Catholic bishop
 Andrés Duque (21st century), American activist
 Carlos Duque (1930–2014), Panamanian politician
 Cynthia Duque (born 1992), Mexican beauty pageant winner
 Francisco Duque III (born 1957), Filipino politician
 Iván Duque Márquez (born 1976), President of Colombia from 2018
 Jaime Duque (born 1931), Colombian fencer
 Jefferson Duque (born 1987), Colombian footballer
 Juan Carlos Duque (born 1982), Spanish footballer
 Leonardo Duque (born 1980), Colombian cyclist
 María Antonieta Duque (born 1970), Venezuelan television presenter, comedian and actress
 Mariana Duque (born 1989), Colombian tennis player
 Orlando Duque (born 1974), Colombian diver
 Pedro Duque (born 1963), Spanish astronaut
 Reynaldo A. Duque (1945–2013), Filipino writer
 Ximena Duque (born 1985), Colombian actress
 Pedro Duque y Cornejo (1677–1757), Spanish Baroque painter and sculptor
 Juan Carlos Duque Gancedo (born 1982), Spanish footballer
 Arturo Duque Villegas (1899–1977), Colombian Roman Catholic archbishop

Fictional entities
 Fernando Duque, Pablo Escobar's lawyer and liaison with the Colombian government in Narcos
 The Duque Family in the American TV series Cane

Spanish-language surnames